Gornja Lomnica may refer to:

 Gornja Lomnica (Vlasotince), village in municipality of Vlasotince, Serbia
 Gornja Lomnica, Croatia, village near Velika Gorica, Croatia